The Taseko River  or Dasiqox in the original Chilcotin, is a tributary of British Columbia's Chilko River, a tributary of the Chilcotin River which joins the Fraser near the city of Williams Lake.

The Taseko has its origins at Taylor Pass in the heart of an alpine area known as the South Chilcotin.  Taylor Pass connects with Slim Creek, a major tributary of Gun Creek, which feeds the Bridge River via Carpenter Lake.  From its source, it flows north then northwest before entering the south end of Upper Taseko Lake next to the Lord River, one of its major tributaries.  The Tchaikazan River, another large tributary, also joins the river via the Taseko Lakes, entering at the area that separates Upper and Lower Taseko Lake.  At the outlet of the two Taseko Lakes the river issues onto the broad Chilcotin Plateau.  From source to Upper Taseko Lake, the Taseko is about 30 kilometres in length.  From Lower Taseko Lake to the Taseko's confluence with the Chilko River is about 85 kilometres.  Including the 25 kilometre length of both Taseko Lakes, the total length of the Taseko River is around 140 kilometres.

A proposed but temporarily shelved hydroelectric proposal would dam and divert the Taseko Lakes and divert the Taseko's flow into Chilko Lake, from where another diversion would take the combined flow of the Chilko and Taseko Rivers and feed it into the coastal drainage of the Homathko River at Tatlayoko Lake, which would also be dammed.  Further dams in the Homathko's Great Canyon are part of the proposal, which would flood key historic sites related to the Chilcotin War of 1864.

Name origin
Taseko derives from the Chilcotin language "Dasiqox", which means "Mosquito River".  The Taseko Lakes in that same language as "Dasiqox Biny", where "Biny" means lake and is a reference in the singular.

Tributaries

Upper reaches
 Granite Creek
 Powell Creek

Taseko Lakes
 Lord River
 Tchaikazan River

Lower reaches
 Beece Creek
 Elkin Creek
 Tete Angela Creek

See also
 List of tributaries of the Fraser River
 Taseko Mountain
 Nemaiah Valley, British Columbia

References

Rivers of the Chilcotin
Tributaries of the Fraser River
Chilcotin Ranges
Cariboo Land District